SVT was an American, San Francisco-based, power pop/new wave band from the late 1970s and early 1980s.  They are perhaps best remembered for their bassist Jack Casady, who had played in both Jefferson Airplane and Hot Tuna.  Other members were singer Brian Marnell, drummer Bill Gibson (later of Huey Lewis and the News, replaced by Paul Zahl), and Nick Buck, also a Hot Tuna veteran, on keyboards.

The group is said to have taken its name from the medical condition known as supraventricular tachycardia. Another plausible explanation is that the name was taken from a model of bass guitar amplifier, the Ampeg Super Vacuum Tube.

SVT recorded two singles in 1979, one EP in 1980, and one album, No Regrets, in 1981.  They were one of the first bands ever to record on San Francisco's 415 Records, who released their single, "Heart of Stone", in 1979. The group disbanded in 1982 after both Zahl and Casady left to form Yanks with Jack Johnson and Owen Masterson. Casady later quit Yanks and was replaced by bassist Steve Aliment.  Brian Marnell died in 1983.  Casady's former Jefferson Airplane bandmate Marty Balin covered the song "Heart of Stone" on his album, Lucky in 1983.

Discography
 1979 Single: "New Year" (live) / "Wanna See You Cry" (live)
 1979 Single: "Heart Of Stone" / "The Last Word"

1980 EP: Extended Play (415 Records)

Side one
"Price of Sex" (Brian Marnell) – 2:28
"I Can See" (Nick Buck) – 2:59
"Red Blue Jeans" (Jack Rhodes, Bill Davis) – 2:05
"Always Comes Back" (Marnell) – 3:55

Side two
"I Walk the Line" (Johnny Cash) – 2:13
"Modern Living" (Buck) – 2:56
"Down at the Beach" (Marnell) – 2:43

Personnel
Nick Buck – keyboards, vocals
Brian Marnell – guitar, vocals
Paul Zahl – drums, vocals
Jack Casady – bass

Production
SVT – producer
Stacey Baird – engineer, co-producer
Recorded at Different Fur Recording, San Francisco
Chris Coyle, Steven Countryman – management
Richard Stutting / Artbreakers – album art and design
Chester Simpson – photography

1981 LP: No Regrets (MSI Records)

Side one
All songs by Brian Marnell except where noted
"Bleeding Hearts" – 4:51
"Waiting for You" – 2:53
"Heart of Stone" – 3:00
"No Regrets" (Brian Marnell, Suzie Kobrofsky) – 3:23
"Money Street" – 5:23

Side two
"Love Blind" – 2:52
"North Beach" – 3:07
"What I Don't Like" – 3:20
"Secret" – 2:44
"Too Late" – 5:07
"You Don't Rock" – 4:35

Personnel
Brian Marnell – vocals, guitars
Jack Casady – electric bass, Gibson mandobass, bass balalaika
Paul Zahl – drums, vocals

Production
SVT – arrangements, mixer
Mark Richardson – producer, engineer, mixer
Recorded at Fantasy Studios, Berkeley, CA
Eddie Harris, Jaime Bridges, Eddie Ciletti – assistant engineers
Michael Herbick, Steve Toby, Jesse Osborne – tech engineers
Mastered at Master Disc, New York City
Howie Weinberg – mastering engineer
Vincent Anton – photography
Suzanne Phister – album cover design, lettering
Richard Stutting / Artbreakers – SVT logo
The Walking Zombie – gear
Steven Countryman – management

2005 CD: No Regrets - expanded version (Rykodisc)

References

External links
Fan site
SVT Photos

American power pop groups
American new wave musical groups
Rock music groups from California
Musical groups from San Francisco